Eileen Margaret Fuchs (née Knowles) (30 May 1920 – 11 January 2013) was a skier and promoter of Scottish skiing, and was known as "the Mother of Scottish Skiing".

Biography 
From 1938-1942 she studied history at Newnham College. Cambridge, where she was one of a number of women who were not allowed to graduate with a full degree.

An accomplished violinist, in 1953 she went to Vienna, to study the violin.  She married Karl Fuchs, an Austrian Olympic skier.

With her husband, Karl, in 1954, she bought the Struan Hotel in Carrbridge near Aviemore, and established the Austrian Ski School.

Eileen & Karl had two children, Lisi and Peter, who both skied at national level.  Peter Fuchs competed in the 1976 Winter Olympics.

After her husband and son's death, Eileen set up the Karl and Peter Fuchs Memorial Fund to help young Speyside skiers.

References

1920 births
2013 deaths
Scottish female skiers
British expatriates in Austria
Alumni of Newnham College, Cambridge